Marie-Claude Asselin is a Canadian former freestyle skier competing from 1977 to 1982 in which she was a three-time world champion.

Skiing career
Asselin competed from 1977 to 1982 in the aerial, ballet and moguls categories of freestyle skiing.  In that time, she won 35 Freestyle World Cup competitions, was the Freestyle World Cup champion in both combined and aerials in 1981, 1982, and 1983 and was the Freestyle World Cup overall champion in 1981 and 1982.

In 1983, Asselin was awarded the Elaine Tanner Trophy for Canadian Female Athlete of the year. Asselin was inducted into the Canadian Ski Hall of Fame in 1991.

World Cup podium finishes

References

External links
 

Canadian female freestyle skiers
1962 births
Living people